Axomiya Bhaxa Unnati Xadhini Xobha was a lite organization formed on Saturday 25 August 1888 (1810 Saka). It is the precursor of the Asam Sahitya Sabha. The first secretary of this society was Shivaram Sarma Bordoloi. The prime objective of forming this society was the development of Assamese language and literature. This is the pioneering society to shape the then Assamese dialect to today’s state.

History
In the 8th decade of the 19th century the Assamese students studying in Calcutta took the Assamese language as the most important unifying factor for the formation of an Assamese nationality. Initially they formed messes in 50 Sitaram Ghosh Street and 62 Sitaram Ghosh Street in Calcutta. As the influx of students increased, the number of messes was also increased. Some important messes added later were 67 Mirzapur Street, 107 Amherst Street, 14 Pratap Chandra Lane, Eden Hospital Street mess etc. They initiated a number of inter-mess activities. Among them the most crucial one was the Tea Party, a social gathering over a cup of tea on every Wednesday and Saturday. They used to discuss various topics in this Tea Party and this is how the concept of Axomiya Bhaxa Unnati Xadhini Xobha was mooted on Saturday 25 August 1888 (1810 Saka), at the 67 Mirzapur Street mess and this Tea Party was converted into a literary organization.

Objectives
The objective of the society was elaborately discussed in the magazine Jonaki (Vol 5, No. 7) under the title "Axomiā Bhāxā Unnati Xādhini Xabhār Karjya Biboroni". It is as follows (English translation: Uddipan Dutta)-

Some other activities

Publishing Jonaki
Among many other important decisions taken by the society, one was to publish a new monthly magazine and this is how Jonaki was born in 1889. The aim and objectives of the society was regularly discussed on the pages of Jonaki.

Baan theatre
Long ago, Assamese actors used to stage plays jointly with Bengali actors under the aegis of  the Bengali Amateur Theatre Party. But in 1903, a division of opinions among the artists from the two linguistic groups led the Assamese artists to the formation of the Baan Theatre. In 1906 the society decided to have a theatre exclusively for Assamese plays.

People associated with the society
Here is a list of those who played a pivotal role in the early imagination of Assamese identity.
From the 50 Sitaram Ghosh Street mess: Benudhar Rajkhowa, Dalimchandra Bora, Lakshiprasad Chaliha, Ramakanta Baruah, Krishnaprasad Duwara, Ramakanta Barkakoti, Gunindranath Baruah, Golapalchandra Baruah, Gunjanan Baruah etc.
From the 62 Sitaram Gosh Street mess: Lakhyeswar Sarma, Tirthanath Kakoti, Hemchandra Goswami, Kanaklal Baruah, Krishna Kumar Baruah, Chandra Kamal Bezbaruah, Ghanashyam Baruah, Kamalchandra Sarma and Lakshminath Bezbaroa etc.

See also
Orunodoi
Jonaki
Asam Sahitya Sabha
Assamese Language Movement
Manipuri Sahitya Parishad

References

External links
Theatrical movement in Assam by Babul Tamuly, Editorial, The Assam Tribune.

Culture of Assam
Assamese literature
Indic literature societies